Jessica Rossi (born 7 January 1992) is a female Italian sports shooter.

Biography
She won the gold medal in the Women's Trap event at the 2012 Summer Olympics, where she scored a world record of 75 in the qualification and a world record of 99 in the final.

Achievements

Records

References

External links
 

1992 births
Living people
Shooters at the 2012 Summer Olympics
Shooters at the 2016 Summer Olympics
Olympic shooters of Italy
Italian female sport shooters
Olympic gold medalists for Italy
Olympic medalists in shooting
Medalists at the 2012 Summer Olympics
Shooters at the 2015 European Games
Trap and double trap shooters
People from Cento
Mediterranean Games gold medalists for Italy
Mediterranean Games medalists in shooting
Competitors at the 2013 Mediterranean Games
Shooters at the 2019 European Games
European Games medalists in shooting
European Games silver medalists for Italy
Shooters of Fiamme Oro
Shooters at the 2020 Summer Olympics
Sportspeople from the Province of Ferrara
20th-century Italian women
21st-century Italian women